The 22691 / 22692 KSR Bengaluru–Hazrat Nizamuddin Rajdhani Express. This train connects Bangalore and Delhi. It was the fastest service on the Bangalore & Delhi sector before Yeshvantapur Delhi Sarai Rohilla AC Duronto Express running via Secunderabad–Nagpur–Bhopal–Agra route.

History
Originally introduced in 1992, this was a weekly train, then converted to bi-weekly, tri-weekly and then four times a week. Before the Konkan Railway came up in 1998, there were only 2 South bound Rajdhani from Delhi. Bangalore Rajdhani Express was a weekly train back then having rake sharing agreement with Thiruvananthapuram Rajdhani Express & it used to run via Chennai Central. In end of March 2010, service 12493/12494, which later became 22693/22694 was added to make it a daily service. This was the first Rajdhani where overnight service standard was changed – the distance being greater than what can be covered overnight at Indian Railway's speeds. It covers a distance of  kilometres in KSR Bangalore City to  direction and it takes 33 hours 30 mins when operating as train number 22691 at an average speed of  while its return journey as train number 22692 takes 33 hrs 30 mins to cover  at an average speed of  thus making it the second fastest train on the Bangalore – Delhi sector running via Secunderabad–Nagpur–Bhopal–Agra route. Currently 22693/94 is being planned to be revived again in – route, which will either run via Hubli or Hubballi–Pune–Vadodara–Kota route or run via Raichur–Solapur–Bhusaval–Bhopal–Agra route. In the midst of the COVID-19 Pandemic, this train was running as 02691/02692 COVID A/C special since May 2020 to November 2021. Catering, bedding, curtains aren't available presently, till the end of the pandemic till which it was expected to run as this special. 22691/22692 was resumed with the other regular trains in SWR on 18 November 2021, when the infections in India plunged to a low not seen before June 2020. Catering and Bedding have been restored and being brought back to the level it was running with before March 2020.

Service 
Bangalore Rajdhani Express is the 2nd fastest train on the Bangalore (earlier known as Bangalore)–Delhi sector after Yeshvantapur–Delhi Sarai Rohilla AC Duronto Express. It is a daily service. It operates as train number 22691 from Krantivira Sangolli Rayanna (Bangalore) to Hazrat Nizamuddin railway station, and as train number 22692 in the reverse direction. It has been converted into a daily service from 1 July 2017.

Coach composition 
The Bangalore Rajdhani generally has a 1 AC 1st Class, 5 AC 2 tier, 11 AC 3 tier, 1 Pantry car, 2 End on Generator coaches taking the total up to 20 coaches.  22693/22694 received LHB coach effective 20 April/21 April 2012. 22691/22692 Bangalore Rajdhani also received LHB coach effectively from 09/08/2012 thus making it to run entirely with LHB coach since 9 August 2012.

Routes & Halts

Traction 

At its introduction in 1992, it was hauled by Kazipet based WDM-3A till Secunderabad after which a Ghaziabad based WAP-1 initially and later by WAP 4 used to haul it for the remainder of the journey. The locomotive change was because the route between Guntakal and Bangalore was a diesel route and not electrified. In 2007, the WAP 4 was replaced by WAP 7. In March 2010, the diesel locomotive was changed to Krishnarajapuram loco shed based WDM-3A or WDM-3D and in April 2013, the WDP 4 diesel locomotive was introduced, while the electric locomotive link was either of Tughlakabad, Ghaziabad or Lallaguda based WAP 7.

As the electrification between Guntakal and Bangalore completed on 30th June 2017, it is now regularly hauled by a Lallaguda based WAP-7 (HOG) equipped locomotive from end to end.

Speed
The maximum permissible speed is upto 130 kmph but it is lower in some parts. Its all coaches are of air conditioned LHB coach type which is capable of reaching 160 kmph but it does not touch. Sometimes people become confused because according to Indian Railways Permanent Way Manual (IRPWM) on its website or Indian Railway Institute of Civil Engineering website, the BG (Broad Gauge) lines have been classified into six groups ‘A’ to ‘E’ on the basis of the future maximum permissible speeds but it may not be same as present speed.

At first it move towards common route with both Mumbai and Chennai and it goes towards Mumbai upto Mathura and Chennai upto Kazipet and the maximum permissible speed of the train or the route is 120 kmph between H. Nizamuddin and Tuglakabad where RDSO has been requested to corroborate the track quality fit for raising sectional speed to 130 kmph. The maximum permissible speed of the train is 130 kmph in Tuglakabad (TKD) –  Palwal (PWL) – Mathura (MTJ) route where it is slower than the fastest train of the route having speed of 160 kmph. After leaving the common route towards Mumbai but not leaving towards Chennai, maximum permissible speed of the train is 130 kmph in Mathura (MTJ) – Agra Cantt (AGC) route where it is slower than the fastest train of the route having speed of 160 kmph. The maximum permissible speed of the train or the route is 130 kmph in Agra Cantt (AGC)  – DHO -  Jhansi - Lalitpur (LAR) route but increasing of speed of H. Nizamuddin - Jhansi Gatimaan Express upto 160 kmph is planned between Agra Cantt and Jhansi and the proposed speed is higher than this Bangalore Rajdhani Express. The maximum permissible speed of the train or the route is 120 kmph in Lalitpur (LAR) – Bina - Jujharpur (JHP) (Near Itarsi) route where proposal for raising of speed upto 130 kmph is under preparation. The maximum permissible speed of the train or the route is 120 kmph between Jujharpur (JHP) and Balharshah (BPQ) except Dharakhoh - Maramijhiri, Chichonda - Teegaon hilly areas. 

The maximum permissible speed of the train or the route will be increased to 130 kmph very soon or it might have been already increased in Ballarshah (BPQ) – Kazipet (KZJ) route. Already, the maximum speed limits between Secunderabad – Kazipet (132 Kms distance) had been enhanced to 130 kmph. 
Speed is unknown between Secunderabad and Dharmavaram. Speed limit is 110 Kmph in Baiyappanahalli - Dharmavaram via Penukonda - Sri Sathya Sai Prashanthi Nilayam- Dharmavaram (extreme slight part is different from route of this train which is KSR Bangalore - Dharmavaram instead of Baiyappanahalli - Dharmavaram) and the speed is same not via Sri Sathya Sai Prashanthi Nilayam but it takes via Sri Sathya Sai Prashanthi Nilayam slightly longer route - as per South Central Railway Press Release Dt: 09.11.2020 and another source   and Baiyappanahalli is near KSR Bangalore.

Gallery

References

Transport in Delhi
Transport in Bangalore
Rail transport in Karnataka
Rajdhani Express trains
Rail transport in Andhra Pradesh
Rail transport in Maharashtra
Rail transport in Delhi
Rail transport in Uttar Pradesh
Rail transport in Madhya Pradesh
Railway services introduced in 1992